The Landquart is a river of Switzerland in the canton of Grisons and a right tributary of the Alpine Rhine. It is formed by the confluence of the two mountain streams, Vereinabach and Verstanclabach, both originating from glaciers in the Silvretta Alps. It flows northwesterly through the village of Klosters, the largest and uppermost village in the Prättigau valley. It empties into the Alpine Rhine in the town of Landquart. Length: , drainage basin: .

See also
 Landquart-Davos Platz railway
 Sunniberg Bridge

External links

Rivers of Switzerland
Rivers of Graubünden
Klosters-Serneus
Luzein
Fideris
Jenaz
Schiers
Grüsch
Malans, Switzerland
Landquart, Switzerland